The City v Country West End Challenge was a one-off all-star game between two representative sides organised by the South Australian National Football League in the absence of a State of Origin game in 1990.

The match was played on 21 May 1990 at Football Park in West Lakes, South Australia, Australia, between The Advertiser Country All-Stars and The News City All-Stars. The Country All-Stars won the match by 41 points.

Teams

The Advertiser Country All-Stars 

Coach: John Cahill

The News City All-Stars 

Coach: Graham Cornes

Best on ground award 
The Fos Williams Medal for best on ground was awarded to Andrew Jarman.

Aftermath and legacy

Start of AFL Era
Overall, 1,869 AFL games would be amassed following this event from players who played in this game.

Adelaide Football Club Inaugural Squad 1991

Other AFL Clubs

Hall of Fame Inductees 
Twelve players, and both coaches, from this game have been inducted into the South Australian Football Hall of Fame.  In 2007, Darren Jarman was inducted into the Australian Football Hall of Fame, whilst both coaches also have this honour.

See also
1990 SANFL season

References

Australian rules football games
History of Australian rules football
1990 in Australian rules football
May 1990 sports events in Australia